Aaron Haruna Omar Martin Cosgrave (born 17 July 1999) is an English professional footballer who plays for King's Lynn Town, on loan from AFC Wimbledon, as a forward.

Career
Cosgrave began his career in the academies at West Ham United and Colchester United. In 2017, Cosgrave signed for Eastern Counties League club Coggeshall Town. Cosgrave scored 12 goals in 37 league appearances during the 2017–18 season as Coggeshall won the league and gained promotion to the Isthmian League North Division. 

Ahead of the 2018–19 season, following a trial with Tranmere Rovers, Cosgrave signed for National League side Havant & Waterlooville. During his time at the club, Cosgrave made 15 league appearances, starting five times, scoring once. In January 2019, Cosgrave dropped a division, signing for National League South club Chelmsford City. Cosgrave made 13 league appearances without scoring for Chelmsford and subsequently moved on to Welling United ahead of the 2019–20 season. At Welling, Cosgrave made 32 appearances in all competitions, scoring once, before signing for Isthmian League outfit Lewes in February 2020. Cosgrave scored five goals in 14 league appearances for Lewes over two campaigns disrupted by the COVID-19 pandemic.

In July 2021, Cosgrave joined AFC Wimbledon after impressing on trial. Later that month he moved on loan to Dover Athletic. Cosgrave made his debut on the opening day of the season as Dover, starting the season on minus 12 points, lost 2–0 at Maidenhead United. His first goal for the club came in his third appearance as he gave Dover a 2–1 lead in an eventual 3–2 defeat to Altrincham. He returned to Wimbledon to make his debut for the club in the EFL Trophy on 9 November 2021, before returning to Dover a few days later. On 30 December 2021, Cosgrave was recalled from his loan spell.

In August 2022 he moved on loan to Southend United. He moved on loan to King's Lynn Town in January 2023.

Career statistics

References

 

1999 births
Living people
English footballers
People from Shenfield
Association football forwards
West Ham United F.C. players
Colchester United F.C. players
Coggeshall Town F.C. players
Havant & Waterlooville F.C. players
Chelmsford City F.C. players
Welling United F.C. players
Lewes F.C. players
AFC Wimbledon players
Dover Athletic F.C. players
Eastern Counties Football League players
National League (English football) players
Isthmian League players
English Football League players
Southend United F.C. players
King's Lynn Town F.C. players